The Armed Forces of the Philippines Reserve Command, known officially as the AFP RESCOM or RESCOM, is one of the Armed Forces of the Philippines' Major Support Commands created for the sole purpose of Reserve Force management, procurement, and organization.

Training
Training is the major task handled by AFPRESCOM. Its primary modes of enlisting reservists; Military Orientation Training Course (MOTC) and the Basic Citizens Military Training (BCMT). Graduates are given enlisted ranks based on reciprocity of their civilian experience in the military environment.

Reserve officers are commissioned based on Armed Forces of the Philippines policy on (direct) commissionship in the reserve force known as Circular Nr 4 series of July 2010. Those who are commissioned through this source subsequently undergo an officer orientation program. Many officers in AFPRESCOM are licensed physicians, dentists, nurses, pharmacists, teachers, lawyers and chaplains. Some are directly commissioned as Lieutenant Colonels through the commissioning program of National Defense College of the Philippines as graduates of the Masters in National Security Administration.

Other than time-in-grade and merit promotions, rank adjustments are authorized depending on civilian qualifications.

Specialization Training
These are the trainings available for military reserves at AFPRESCOM:

 SFOOT (UWOC)- Special Forces Operations Orientation Training (Unconventional Warfare Operations Course)
Trainer: PA Special Forces
 EORA - Explosives Ordnance Reconnaissance Agent Course
Trainer : 710th SPOW PAF
 SCUBA combat diver course
Trainer: AFPRESCOM SCUBA DIVER/NAVSOG-PN
 Specialized CMO - Civil Military Affairs Orientation Course
Trainer: PA CMOG School
 K-9 Handling Course
Trainer: PA
 VIP Security Protection Course
Trainer: PA SEG in coordination with PNP CSG
 SROOT (formerly SROC) - Scout Ranger Operations Orientation Training
Trainer: PA Scout Rangers
 Field Artillery Orientation Course
Trainer: PA Artillery Regiment
 Light Mechanized Infantry Orientation Training
Trainer: PA Mechanized Infantry Division
 AGOS - Air-to-Ground Operations System Orientation course
Trainer: PAF
 USAR -Urban Search and Rescue Training
Trainer: well trained and professional TASBde personnel and ATG Training staff
 WASAR- Water Search and Rescue Training
Trainer: well trained and professional TASBde personnel and ATG Training staff

Types of Reservists
There are currently two (2) types of reservists in the component of the Armed Forces of the Philippines (AFP) Reserve Force:
 Ready Reservists - physically-fit and tactically-current reservist personnel that are always on constant alert and training; and ready to mobilize once a mobilization order has been given.
 Standby Reservists - reservist personnel who do not maintain currency in specialization qualifications but the base for expansion, support and augmentation to the Ready Reserve Force as needed.

The Commissioned Officer Corps
Most of the officers of AFPRESCOM are directly commissioned through AFP Circular Nr. 4 and 6 and may come from any of the following professions, :
 Lawyers and Paralegal Specialists (Judge Advocate General Service)
 Medical Doctors (Medical Corps)
 Nurses (Nurse Corps)
 Dentists (Dental Service)
 Veterinarians (Veterinary Corps)
 Licensed Teachers (Corps of Professors)
 Allied Medical, Business, and Mass Communication Specialists (Medical Administrative Corps)
 Licensed Engineers (Corps of Engineers)
 Ordained Chaplains (Chaplain Service)

Lineage of Commanding Officers
Commanding Officers of the AFPRESCOM are drawn from all the Service Commands of the AFP. The commanding officer is appointed and reports directly to the Chairman of the Joint Chiefs.

  BGEN Cesar A. Abella, AFP
  BGEN Froilan M. Maglaya, AFP
  BGEN Joel A. Cabides, AFP
  BGEN Juanito W. Dalmas, AFP
  BGEN Lito S. Tabangcura, AFP
  BGEN Quirino S. Calonzo, AFP
  BGEN Alex C. Capiña, AFP
  BGEN Johnny L. Macanas, AFP
  BGEN Leoncio A. Cirunay Jr., AFP
  COL Pascual Luis D. Bedia, PA
  BGEN Noel S. Buan, PA
  BGEN Rolando R. Rodil, PA
  BGEN Ferdinand M. Fraginal, PN(M)
  BGEN Vicente M. Ronatay, PN(M)

Organization

Base Units
 Headquarters & Headquarters Service Group
 AFPRESCOM Training Group (ATG)
 AFPRESCOM Affiliated Reserve Group (ARG)
 AFPRESCOM Technical and Administrative Services Reserve Group (TASRG)

Civil Military Reserve Units
 Civil Military Affairs Brigade (CMABde)

Technical Service Reserve Units
 1st Technical & Administrative Service Brigade, National Capital Region (Reserve)
 103rd Technical & Administrative Services Group (Reserve)
 104th Technical & Administrative Services Group (Reserve)
 2nd Technical & Administrative Service Brigade, Northern Luzon (Reserve)
 3rd Technical & Administrative Services Brigade, Southern Luzon (Reserve)
 4th Technical & Administrative Services Brigade, Western (Reserve)
 5th Technical & Administrative Services Brigade, Central (Reserve)
 6th Technical & Administrative Services Brigade, Eastern Mindanao (Reserve)
 7th Technical & Administrative Services Brigade, Western Mindanao (Reserve)

Affiliated Reserve Units
 1st AFP (TALON) General Hospital
 1st (UPHD) AFP Affiliated Reserve Medical Center
 1st (ARMSCOR) Arsenal Battalion (Reserve)
 1st (NGCP) AFP Power Division (Reserve)
 2nd AFP AFFILIATED RESERVE MEDICAL CENTER (SLH)
 404th (SOLARWINDS) Transport Battalion (Reserve)
 405th (SHAHIN) Transport Battalion (Reserve)
 501st (LWUA) Water Battalion (Reserve)
 502nd (MAYNILAD) Water Service Battalion (Reserve)
 503rd (Manila Water) Water Service Battalion (Reserve)
 602nd (VMMC) Medical Service Battalion 
 701st (PHILCCOM) Signal Battalion (Reserve)
 856th (G-BBC) Engineering & Construction Battalion (Reserve)
 903rd (KPI) Signal Battalion (Reserve)
 704th (RCCI) Commo-Battalion (Reserve)
 409th (ACE) Transport-Battalion (Reserve)
 408th (Flying "A") Transport-Battalion (Reserve)
 855th (AYIN) Electrical Engineering Service Battalion (Reserve)

Standby Reserve Units
 Standby Reserve Battalion

Awards and decorations
Currently Awarded on April 15, 2017, the "Award of Excellence" with the highest score of 96.84% during the Annual General Inspection 2016 conducted by the Office of the Inspector General AFP headed by newly installed commander Inspector General of the Armed Forces of the Philippines, MGEN OSCAR T LACTAO AFP at AFPRESCOM Compound, CGEA, QC

Campaign streamers

Badges

References
Citations

Bibliography

 AFPRESCOM Official Site
 AFP-MOT Manual, 2001, AFPRESCOM
 AFPRESCOM Facebook

See also
 Philippine Army Reserve Command
 Philippine Air Force Reserve Command
 Philippine Navy Reserve Command
 Philippine Coast Guard Auxiliary

Reserve and Auxiliary Units of the Philippine Military
Joint military units and formations of the Philippines